Sister Kate can refer to:

People
Katherine Mary Clutterbuck (1860-1946), an Anglican nun known as Sister Kate who ran orphanages for Aboriginal children in Western Australia

Movies and Television
Sister Kate (TV series), an American television sitcom
Sister Kate Valentine, a character from Chrono Crusade

Music
"I Wish I Could Shimmy Like My Sister Kate", a song and tune published by Clarence Williams and Armand Piron in 1919.
Sister Kate (album), a 1971 album by Kate Taylor.

Literature
Sister Kate is a 1982 novel by Jean Bedford, based on the life of Ned Kelly's sister, Kate Kelly.